Britton is a city in and the county seat of Marshall County, South Dakota, United States. The population was 1,215 at the 2020 census.

A weekly newspaper, the Britton Journal, is published in Britton.

History
Britton was founded in 1884 as a stop on the Chicago, Milwaukee, St. Paul and Pacific Railroad. In 1885, the town was designated county seat of the newly formed Marshall County. It received its city rights in 1906. The city is named after Isaac Britton, a railroad official.

Geography
Britton is located at  (45.792817, -97.752912).

Britton has been assigned the ZIP code 57430 and the FIPS place code 07380.

Climate

Demographics

2010 census
As of the census of 2010, there were 1,241 people, 574 households, and 313 families living in the city. The racial makeup of the city was 97.8% White, 0.5% African American, 0.7% Native American, 0.1% Asian, and 0.9% from two or more races. Hispanic or Latino of any race were 1.1% of the population.

There were 574 households, of which 23.0% had children under the age of 18 living with them, 44.6% were married couples living together, 6.1% had a female householder with no husband present, 3.8% had a male householder with no wife present, and 45.5% were non-families. 41.3% of all households were made up of individuals, and 21.7% had someone living alone who was 65 years of age or older. The average household size was 2.06 and the average family size was 2.79.

The median age in the city was 48.6 years. 20.1% of residents were under the age of 18; 6% were between the ages of 18 and 24; 18.7% were from 25 to 44; 27.7% were from 45 to 64; and 27.5% were 65 years of age or older. The gender makeup of the city was 48.7% male and 51.3% female.

2000 census
As of the census of 2000, there were 1,328 people, 580 households, and 346 families living in the city. The population density was 1,893.5 people per square mile (732.5/km2). There were 667 housing units at an average density of 951.0 per square mile (367.9/km2). The racial makeup of the city was 97.82% White, 1.13% Native American, 0.15% Asian, 0.08% from other races, and 0.83% from two or more races. Hispanic or Latino of any race were 0.98% of the population.

There were 580 households, out of which 27.4% had children under the age of 18 living with them, 49.5% were married couples living together, 6.9% had a female householder with no husband present, and 40.2% were non-families. 37.4% of all households were made up of individuals, and 22.9% had someone living alone who was 65 years of age or older. The average household size was 2.18 and the average family size was 2.88.

In the city, the population was spread out, with 22.9% under the age of 18, 5.0% from 18 to 24, 23.2% from 25 to 44, 22.2% from 45 to 64, and 26.7% who were 65 years of age or older. The median age was 44 years. For every 100 females, there were 87.8 males. For every 100 females age 18 and over, there were 82.9 males.

As of 2000 the median income for a household in the city was $31,148, and the median income for a family was $37,639. Males had a median income of $29,931 versus $18,500 for females. The per capita income for the city was $18,327. About 5.7% of families and 8.7% of the population were below the poverty line, including 4.7% of those under age 18 and 16.2% of those age 65 or over.

Transportation

The Dakota, Missouri Valley and Western Railroad provides rail service to Britton.

Education
The Britton-Hecla school district covers Britton.  There is one elementary school and one high school on the same premises.

Notable people
 Frederic J. Brown II, U.S. Army lieutenant general
 Frank Farrar, twenty-fourth Governor of South Dakota.
 Dallas Goedert, NFL tight end for the Philadelphia Eagles.
 Susan Wismer, State Senator and candidate for Governor of South Dakota in 2014

Footnotes

External links
 Marshall County Journal
 Ivan Besse, Britton, South Dakota, 1938-39. —Silent amateur film of daily life in Britton, SD in 1938.
 Part 1 | Part 2 | Part 3 | Part 4 | Part 5 | Part 6 | Part 7 | Part 8 | Part 9 | Part 10

Cities in South Dakota
Cities in Marshall County, South Dakota
County seats in South Dakota
Populated places established in 1884
1884 establishments in Dakota Territory